Cercospora tuberculans is a fungal plant pathogen.

References

External links

tuberculans
Fungal plant pathogens and diseases